Nistor is a Romanian male given name and surname. Individuals with this name include:

Nistor Grozavu
Nistor Văidean
Constantin Nistor (disambiguation), two athletes
Dan Nistor (born 1988), Romanian footballer
Ion Nistor (1876–1962), Romanian historian and politician
Steliana Nistor (born 1989), Romanian gymnast
Steven Nistor (born 1979), American drummer

See also
 Nistorești (disambiguation)

Romanian masculine given names
Romanian-language surnames